Laura Naginskaitė (born 10 August 1993 ) is a Lithuanian judoka. She represented Lithuania at 2010 Summer Youth Olympics in Singapore, where she won bronze medal. In bronze medal final she defeated Reotem Shor from Israel 000-100.

References

External links
 

1993 births
Living people
Lithuanian female judoka
Judoka at the 2010 Summer Youth Olympics